Emiliano Gastón Mozzone Sueiro (born 23 April 1998) is a Uruguayan professional footballer who plays as a forward.

Career
A youth academy product of Fénix, Mozzone made his professional debut on 28 February 2016, coming on as a 90th minute substitute for Cecilio Waterman in a 2–0 win against Peñarol. He scored his first goal on 15 November 2017 in a 4–1 win against Montevideo Wanderers.

Mozzone signed for Albanian top division club KF Bylis in February 2020. He made his debut for the club on 8 February 2020, scoring a goal in 1–1 draw against Skënderbeu Korçë.

For the 2021–22 season, he joined Bellinzona in the third-tier Swiss Promotion League.

References

External links
 

1998 births
Living people
Footballers from Montevideo
Uruguayan footballers
Association football forwards
Centro Atlético Fénix players
KF Bylis Ballsh players
FC Schaffhausen players
AC Bellinzona players
Uruguayan Primera División players
Kategoria Superiore players
Swiss Challenge League players
Swiss Promotion League players
Uruguayan expatriate footballers
Expatriate footballers in Albania
Uruguayan expatriate sportspeople in Albania
Expatriate footballers in Switzerland
Uruguayan expatriate sportspeople in Switzerland